The 1980 Baylor Bears football team represented the Baylor University in the 1980 NCAA Division I-A football season.  The Bears finished the season first in the Southwest Conference. During Mike Singletary's senior season of 1980, Baylor won 10 games for the first time in school history. Throughout his Baylor career, Singletary averaged 15 tackles per game.  After Baylor's 16–0 victory over Texas in the regular season finale, the Longhorns did not suffer another shutout for 24 years, which was one of the longest non-shutout streaks in college football history.

Schedule

Roster

Game summaries

Texas Tech

Source: Palm Beach Post

Baylor's first win in Lubbock since 1966.

Awards and honors
 Mike Singletary, (All-America) honors
 Mike Singletary, Davey O'Brien Memorial Trophy, awarded to the most outstanding player in the Southwest Conference.

Team players drafted into the NFL
The following players were drafted into professional football following the season.

References

Baylor
Southwest Conference football champion seasons
Baylor Bears football seasons
Baylor Bears football